Holy Resurrection Church in Rabat is the oldest of three functioning Orthodox churches in Morocco. It is under the jurisdiction of the Russian Orthodox Church.

History
The first stone of the church was laid on July 6, 1931. The temple was consecrated on November 13, 1932, in honour of the Holy Resurrection of Jesus Christ by metropolitan Eulogius (Georgiyevsky).

The church was painted completely by icon-painters from Moscow in 2011.

References

External links

 Official web-site
 Official Page at Facebook 

Russian Orthodox church buildings
Religious buildings and structures in Rabat
Churches in Morocco
Eastern Orthodox church buildings in Morocco